PB-46 Pishin-cum-Karezat is a constituency of the Provincial Assembly of Balochistan.

General elections 2013

General elections 2008

See also 

 PB-45 (Quetta-IX)
 PB-47 Pishin-I

References

External links
 Election commission Pakistan's official website
 Awazoday.com check result
 Balochistan's Assembly official site

Constituencies of Balochistan